Hippolyte Louis Rimbaut (1818–1888) was a 19th-century French playwright.

A collaborator with Le Temps, his plays were presented on the most important Parisian stages of the first half of the 19th century, including the Théâtre du Panthéon, the Théâtre de l'Ambigu, and the Théâtre des Délassements-Comiques.

Contrary to what some sources can write, it was not a pseudonym for Fulgence de Bury.

Works 

 Diane de Poitiers, ou Deux fous et un roi, drama in 3 acts, with Charles Desnoyer, 1833
 Le Fils de Ninon, drama in 3 acts, mingled with songs, with Jacques-François Ancelot and E. F. Varez, 1834
 Angélina, drama in 3 acts, mingled with songs, 1835
 Vaugelas, ou le Ménage d'un savant, comédie en vaudeville in 1 act, with Desnoyer, 1836
 L'Honneur de ma mère, drama in 3 acts, with Auguste-Louis-Désiré Boulé, 1837
 Guillaume Norwood, ou Une haine de vieillards, drama in 3 acts, with Hippolyte-Jules Demolière, 1838
 Corneille et Richelieu, comédie en vaudeville in 1 act, with Boulé, 1839
 Le Marquis de Brancas, comedy in 3 acts, mingled with songs, after a short story by Alexandre de Lavergne, with Demolière and Laurençot, 1839
 Le Sauf conduit, comédie en vaudeville in 2 acts, 1839
 L'amie et l'amant, ou La confiance du mari, comédie en vaudeville in 1 act, with Charles Potier, 1840
 Les Diners à trente deux sous, vaudeville in 1 act, with the Cogniard brothers, 1840
 Denise, ou l'Avis du ciel, drama in 5 acts, with Boulé, 1840
 Émery le négociant, drama in 3 acts, with  Boulé, 1842
 La Fille du diable, vaudeville fantastique in 1 act, with Salvat, 1847
 Marceline la vachère, drame-vaudeville in 3 acts, with Laurençot, 1847
 Peu s'en fallait, esquisse de mœurs in 3 tableaux and in verses, 1847
 Un coup de pinceau, comédie en vaudeville in 1 act, with Charles Henri Ladislas Laurençot, 1848
 Entre amis, vaudeville in 1 act, with Laurençot, 1848
 Le Ver luisant, ou la Métempsycose, féérie in 5 acts and 12 parts, with Édouard Brisebarre, 1850
 Un doigt de vin, comédie en vaudeville en 1 act, with Achille Bourdois, 1852
 Les Postillons de Crèvecoeur, scènes de la vie de campagne, in 1 act, with Brisebarre, 1853
 Trois pour un secret, scène de la vie de famille, with Brisebarre, 1855
 Le Jour du frotteur, scène de la vie de ménage, with Brisebarre, 1856
 Le Professeur des cuisinières, scènes de la vie de ménage, with Brisebarre, 1856
 La Chasse au sorcier, comedy in 3 acts, 1859
 Le Dompteur de femmes, vaudeville in 1 act, with Deslandes, 1859
 Taureau le brasseur, vaudeville in 1 act, with Adolphe Salvat, 1859
 L'Avocat des dames, comédie en vaudeville in 1 act, with Raymond Deslandes, 1864
 Le Cadeau d'un horloger, vaudeville in 1 act, 1866
 Les Chambres de bonnes, vaudeville in 3 acts, with Deslandes, 1868
 Une fausse joie, comedy in 1 act, with Deslandes, 1869
 Le Commandant Frochard, comedy in 3 acts, with Deslandes, 1873
 Les Échéances d'Angèle, comedy in 1 act, with Alfred Delacour, 1878

Bibliography 
 Joseph Marie Quérard, La littérature française contemporaine: 1827-1849, 1857, (p. 190)
 Michel Autrand, Le théâtre en France de 1870 à 1914, 2006, (p. 266) et (p. 648)

References 

19th-century French dramatists and playwrights
1818 births
1888 deaths